Teo Romano Bellia (born 17 January 1960) is an Italian actor, voice actor and journalist.

Biography
Bellia began his career at 13 years of age as a disc jockey. He performed for several radio stations across Italy, most notably in Colleferro. As a journalist, Bellia worked for La7 from 1985 to 1986 (then called Telemontecarlo) and he even worked for Telemontecarlo's corresponding news shows from the 1980s to the early 2000s.

As a voice actor, Bellia serves as the official Italian voice of Tim Allen. He also voiced Moe Szyslak in the Italian dub of The Simpsons since the ninth season as well as dubbing Tom Tucker in Family Guy and He-Man in He-Man and the Masters of the Universe. He also provided the Italian voice of Marty McFly (portrayed by Michael J. Fox) in Back to the Future until he was replaced by Sandro Acerbo in the sequels.

Filmography

Cinema
One Hundred Days in Palermo (1984)

Dubbing roles

Animation
Moe Szyslak in The Simpsons (seasons 9+)
Tom Tucker in Family Guy
He-Man in 'He-Man and the Masters of the Universe
Dale in Chip 'n' Dale (since 1990)
Tito in Oliver & Company
Nigel in The Wild
Daffy Duck in Daffy Duck's Quackbusters
Morph in Treasure Planet

Live action
Eliot Arnold in Big Trouble
Scott Calvin / Toy Santa in The Santa Clause 2
Scott Calvin in The Santa Clause 3: The Escape Clause
Dave Douglas in The Shaggy Dog
Doug Madsen in Wild Hogs
Officer George Hannagan in 11:14
Tommy Zelda in Crazy on the Outside
Marty McFly in Back to the Future
Tom Paris in Star Trek: Voyager (seasons 5–7)
Zed in Pulp Fiction
Leo Getz in Lethal Weapon 2
Leo Getz in Lethal Weapon 3
Leo Getz in Lethal Weapon 4
"Gator" Purify in Jungle Fever
Pat Healy in There's Something About Mary

References

External links

 
 

1960 births
Living people
Male actors from Rome
Italian male voice actors
Italian male journalists
Italian voice directors
20th-century Italian male actors
21st-century Italian male actors